The Art of Computer Programming (TAOCP) is a comprehensive monograph written by the computer scientist Donald Knuth presenting programming algorithms and their analysis.  Volumes 1–5 are intended to represent the central core of computer programming for sequential machines.

When Knuth began the project in 1962, he originally conceived of it as a single book with twelve chapters. The first three volumes of what was then expected to be a seven-volume set were published in 1968, 1969, and 1973. Work began in earnest on Volume 4 in 1973, but was suspended in 1977 for work on typesetting prompted by the second edition of Volume 2. Writing of the final copy of Volume 4A began in longhand in 2001, and the first online pre-fascicle, 2A, appeared later in 2001. The first published installment of Volume 4 appeared in paperback as Fascicle 2 in 2005.
The hardback Volume 4A, combining Volume 4, Fascicles 0–4, was published in 2011. Volume 4, Fascicle 6 ("Satisfiability") was released in December 2015; Volume 4, Fascicle 5 ("Mathematical Preliminaries Redux; Backtracking; Dancing Links") was released in November 2019.

Volume 4B consists of material evolved from Fascicles 5 and 6. The manuscript was sent to the publisher on August 1, 2022 and the volume was published in September 2022.
Fascicle 7, planned for Volume 4C, was the subject of Knuth's talk on August 3, 2022.

History

After winning a Westinghouse Talent Search scholarship, Knuth enrolled at the Case Institute of Technology (now Case Western Reserve University), where his performance was so outstanding that the faculty voted to award him a master of science upon his completion of the bachelor degree. During his summer vacations, Knuth was hired by the Burroughs Corporation to write compilers, earning more in his summer months than full professors did for an entire year. Such exploits made Knuth a topic of discussion among the mathematics department, which included Richard S. Varga.

In January 1962, when he was a graduate student in the mathematics department at Caltech, Knuth was approached by Addison-Wesley to write a book about compiler design, and he proposed a larger scope. He came up with a list of twelve chapter titles the same day. In the summer of 1962 he worked on a FORTRAN compiler for UNIVAC. During this time, he also came up with a mathematical analysis of linear probing, which convinced him to present the material with a quantitative approach. After receiving his Ph.D. in June 1963, he began working on his manuscript, of which he finished his first draft in June 1965, at  hand-written pages. He had assumed that about five hand-written pages would translate into one printed page, but his publisher said instead that about  hand-written pages translated to one printed page. This meant he had approximately  printed pages of material, which closely matches the size of the first three published volumes. At this point, Knuth received support from Richard S. Varga, who was the scientific adviser to the publisher. Varga was visiting Olga Taussky-Todd and John Todd at Caltech. With Varga's enthusiastic endorsement, the publisher accepted Knuth's expanded plans. In its expanded version, the book would be published in seven volumes, each with just one or two chapters. Due to the growth in Chapter 7, which was fewer than 100 pages of the 1965 manuscript, per Vol. 4A p. vi, the plan for Volume 4 has since expanded to include Volumes 4A, 4B, 4C, 4D, and possibly more.

In 1976, Knuth prepared a second edition of Volume 2, requiring it to be typeset again, but the style of type used in the first edition (called hot type) was no longer available. In 1977, he decided to spend some time creating something more suitable. Eight years later, he returned with TEX, which is currently used for all volumes.

The offer of a so-called Knuth reward check worth "one hexadecimal dollar" (100HEX base 16 cents, in decimal, is $2.56) for any errors found, and the correction of these errors in subsequent printings, has contributed to the highly polished and still-authoritative nature of the work, long after its first publication. Another characteristic of the volumes is the variation in the difficulty of the exercises. Knuth even has a numerical difficulty scale for rating those exercises, varying from 0 to 50, where 0 is trivial, and 50 is an open question in contemporary research.

Knuth's dedication reads:

This series of books is affectionately dedicatedto the Type 650 computer once installed atCase Institute of Technology,with whom I have spent many pleasant evenings.

Assembly language in the book
All examples in the books use a language called "MIX assembly language", which runs on the hypothetical MIX computer. Currently, the MIX computer is being replaced by the MMIX computer, which is a RISC version. Software such as GNU MDK exists to provide emulation of the MIX architecture. Knuth considers the use of assembly language necessary for the speed and memory usage of algorithms to be judged.

Critical response
Knuth was awarded the 1974 Turing Award "for his major contributions to the analysis of algorithms […], and in particular for his contributions to the 'art of computer programming' through his well-known books in a continuous series by this title." American Scientist has included this work among "100 or so Books that shaped a Century of Science", referring to the twentieth century, Covers of the third edition of Volume 1 quote Bill Gates as saying, "If you think you're a really good programmer… read (Knuth's) Art of Computer Programming… You should definitely send me a résumé if you can read the whole thing." The New York Times referred to it as "the profession's defining treatise".

Volumes

Completed
 Volume 1 – Fundamental Algorithms
 Chapter 1 – Basic concepts
 Chapter 2 – Information structures
 Volume 2 – Seminumerical Algorithms
 Chapter 3 – Random numbers
 Chapter 4 – Arithmetic
 Volume 3 – Sorting and Searching
 Chapter 5 – Sorting
 Chapter 6 – Searching
 Volume 4A – Combinatorial Algorithms
 Chapter 7 – Combinatorial searching (part 1)
 Volume 4B – Combinatorial Algorithms
 Chapter 7 – Combinatorial searching (part 2)

Planned
 Volume 4C... – Combinatorial Algorithms (chapters 7 & 8 released in several subvolumes)
 Chapter 7 – Combinatorial searching (continued)
 Chapter 8 – Recursion
 Volume 5 – Syntactic Algorithms
 Chapter 9 – Lexical scanning (also includes string search and data compression)
 Chapter 10 – Parsing techniques
 Volume 6 – The Theory of Context-Free Languages
 Volume 7 – Compiler Techniques

Chapter outlines

Completed

Volume 1 – Fundamental Algorithms
 Chapter 1 – Basic concepts
 1.1. Algorithms
 1.2. Mathematical Preliminaries
 1.2.1. Mathematical Induction
 1.2.2. Numbers, Powers, and Logarithms
 1.2.3. Sums and Products
 1.2.4. Integer Functions and Elementary Number Theory
 1.2.5. Permutations and Factorials
 1.2.6. Binomial Coefficients
 1.2.7. Harmonic Numbers
 1.2.8. Fibonacci Numbers
 1.2.9. Generating Functions
 1.2.10. Analysis of an Algorithm
 1.2.11. Asymptotic Representations
 1.2.11.1. The O-notation
 1.2.11.2. Euler's summation formula
 1.2.11.3. Some asymptotic calculations
 1.3 MMIX (MIX in the hardback copy but updated by fascicle 1)
 1.3.1. Description of MMIX
 1.3.2. The MMIX Assembly Language
 1.3.3. Applications to Permutations
 1.4. Some Fundamental Programming Techniques
 1.4.1. Subroutines
 1.4.2. Coroutines
 1.4.3. Interpretive Routines
 1.4.3.1. A MIX simulator
 1.4.3.2. Trace routines
 1.4.4. Input and Output
 1.4.5. History and Bibliography
 Chapter 2 – Information Structures
 2.1. Introduction
 2.2. Linear Lists
 2.2.1. Stacks, Queues, and Deques
 2.2.2. Sequential Allocation
 2.2.3. Linked Allocation (topological sorting)
 2.2.4. Circular Lists
 2.2.5. Doubly Linked Lists
 2.2.6. Arrays and Orthogonal Lists
 2.3. Trees
 2.3.1. Traversing Binary Trees
 2.3.2. Binary Tree Representation of Trees
 2.3.3. Other Representations of Trees
 2.3.4. Basic Mathematical Properties of Trees
 2.3.4.1. Free trees
 2.3.4.2. Oriented trees
 2.3.4.3. The "infinity lemma"
 2.3.4.4. Enumeration of trees
 2.3.4.5. Path length
 2.3.4.6. History and bibliography
 2.3.5. Lists and Garbage Collection
 2.4. Multilinked Structures
 2.5. Dynamic Storage Allocation
 2.6. History and Bibliography

Volume 2 – Seminumerical Algorithms
 Chapter 3 – Random Numbers
 3.1. Introduction
 3.2. Generating Uniform Random Numbers
 3.2.1. The Linear Congruential Method
 3.2.1.1. Choice of modulus
 3.2.1.2. Choice of multiplier
 3.2.1.3. Potency
 3.2.2. Other Methods
 3.3. Statistical Tests
 3.3.1. General Test Procedures for Studying Random Data
 3.3.2. Empirical Tests
 3.3.3. Theoretical Tests
 3.3.4. The Spectral Test
 3.4. Other Types of Random Quantities
 3.4.1. Numerical Distributions
 3.4.2. Random Sampling and Shuffling
 3.5. What Is a Random Sequence?
 3.6. Summary
 Chapter 4 – Arithmetic
 4.1. Positional Number Systems
 4.2. Floating Point Arithmetic
 4.2.1. Single-Precision Calculations
 4.2.2. Accuracy of Floating Point Arithmetic
 4.2.3. Double-Precision Calculations
 4.2.4. Distribution of Floating Point Numbers
 4.3. Multiple Precision Arithmetic
 4.3.1. The Classical Algorithms
 4.3.2. Modular Arithmetic
 4.3.3. How Fast Can We Multiply?
 4.4. Radix Conversion
 4.5. Rational Arithmetic
 4.5.1. Fractions
 4.5.2. The Greatest Common Divisor
 4.5.3. Analysis of Euclid's Algorithm
 4.5.4. Factoring into Primes
 4.6. Polynomial Arithmetic
 4.6.1. Division of Polynomials
 4.6.2. Factorization of Polynomials
 4.6.3. Evaluation of Powers (addition-chain exponentiation)
 4.6.4. Evaluation of Polynomials
 4.7. Manipulation of Power Series

Volume 3 – Sorting and Searching
 Chapter 5 – Sorting
 5.1. Combinatorial Properties of Permutations
 5.1.1. Inversions
 5.1.2. Permutations of a Multiset
 5.1.3. Runs
 5.1.4. Tableaux and Involutions
 5.2. Internal sorting
 5.2.1. Sorting by Insertion
 5.2.2. Sorting by Exchanging
 5.2.3. Sorting by Selection
 5.2.4. Sorting by Merging
 5.2.5. Sorting by Distribution
 5.3. Optimum Sorting
 5.3.1. Minimum-Comparison Sorting
 5.3.2. Minimum-Comparison Merging
 5.3.3. Minimum-Comparison Selection
 5.3.4. Networks for Sorting
 5.4. External Sorting
 5.4.1. Multiway Merging and Replacement Selection
 5.4.2. The Polyphase Merge
 5.4.3. The Cascade Merge
 5.4.4. Reading Tape Backwards
 5.4.5. The Oscillating Sort
 5.4.6. Practical Considerations for Tape Merging
 5.4.7. External Radix Sorting
 5.4.8. Two-Tape Sorting
 5.4.9. Disks and Drums
 5.5. Summary, History, and Bibliography
 Chapter 6 – Searching
 6.1. Sequential Searching
 6.2. Searching by Comparison of Keys
 6.2.1. Searching an Ordered Table
 6.2.2. Binary Tree Searching
 6.2.3. Balanced Trees
 6.2.4. Multiway Trees
 6.3. Digital Searching
 6.4. Hashing
 6.5. Retrieval on Secondary Keys

Volume 4A – Combinatorial Algorithms, Part 1
 Chapter 7 – Combinatorial Searching
 7.1. Zeros and Ones
 7.1.1. Boolean Basics
 7.1.2. Boolean Evaluation
 7.1.3. Bitwise Tricks and Techniques
 7.1.4. Binary Decision Diagrams
 7.2. Generating All Possibilities
 7.2.1. Generating Basic Combinatorial Patterns
 7.2.1.1. Generating all n-tuples
 7.2.1.2. Generating all permutations
 7.2.1.3. Generating all combinations
 7.2.1.4. Generating all partitions
 7.2.1.5. Generating all set partitions
 7.2.1.6. Generating all trees
 7.2.1.7. History and further references

Volume 4B – Combinatorial Algorithms, Part 2
 Chapter 7 – Combinatorial Searching (continued)
 7.2. Generating all possibilities (continued)
 7.2.2. Backtrack programming (published in Fascicle 5)
 7.2.2.1. Dancing links (includes discussion of Exact cover) (published in Fascicle 5)
 7.2.2.2. Satisfiability (published in Fascicle 6)

Planned

Volumes 4C, 4D, .. – Combinatorial Algorithms
 Chapter 7 – Combinatorial Searching (continued)
 7.2. Generating all possibilities (continued)
 7.2.2. Backtrack programming (continued)
 7.2.2.3. Constraint satisfaction (online draft in pre-fascicle 7A)
 7.2.2.4. Hamiltonian paths and cycles (online draft in pre-fascicle 8A)
 7.2.2.5. Cliques
 7.2.2.6. Covers (Vertex cover, Set cover problem, Exact cover, Clique cover)
 7.2.2.7. Squares
 7.2.2.8. A potpourri of puzzles (online draft in pre-fascicle 9B) (includes Perfect digital invariant)
 7.2.2.9. Estimating backtrack costs (chapter 6 of "Selected Papers on Analysis of Algorithms", and Fascicle 5, pp. 44−47, under the heading "Running time estimates")
 7.2.3. Generating inequivalent patterns (includes discussion of Pólya enumeration theorem) (see "Techniques for Isomorph Rejection", chapter 4 of "Classification Algorithms for Codes and Designs" by Kaski and Östergård)
 7.3. Shortest paths
 7.4. Graph algorithms (online draft in pre-fascicle 12A)
 7.4.1. Components and traversal (online draft in pre-fascicle 12A)
 7.4.1.1. Union-find algorithms (online draft in pre-fascicle 12A)
 7.4.1.2. Depth-first search (online draft in pre-fascicle 12A)
 7.4.1.3. Vertex and edge connectivity
 7.4.2. Special classes of graphs
 7.4.3. Expander graphs
 7.4.4. Random graphs
 7.5. Graphs and optimization (online draft in pre-fascicle 14A)
 7.5.1. Bipartite matching (including maximum-cardinality matching, Stable marriage problem, Mariages Stables) (online draft in pre-fascicle 14A)
 7.5.2. The assignment problem
 7.5.3. Network flows
 7.5.4. Optimum subtrees
 7.5.5. Optimum matching
 7.5.6. Optimum orderings
 7.6. Independence theory
 7.6.1. Independence structures
 7.6.2. Efficient matroid algorithms
 7.7. Discrete dynamic programming (see also Transfer-matrix method)
 7.8. Branch-and-bound techniques
 7.9. Herculean tasks (aka NP-hard problems)
 7.10. Near-optimization
 Chapter 8 – Recursion (chapter 22 of "Selected Papers on Analysis of Algorithms")

Volume 5 – Syntactic Algorithms
 Chapter 9 – Lexical scanning (includes also string search and data compression)
 Chapter 10 – Parsing techniques

Volume 6 – The Theory of Context-free Languages

Volume 7 – Compiler Techniques

English editions

Current editions
These are the current editions in order by volume number:
 The Art of Computer Programming, Volumes 1-4B Boxed Set. (Reading, Massachusetts: Addison-Wesley, 2023), 3904pp. 
 Volume 1: Fundamental Algorithms. Third Edition (Reading, Massachusetts: Addison-Wesley, 1997), xx+650pp. . Errata:  (2011-01-08),  (2020-03-26, 27th printing). Addenda:  (2011).
 Volume 2: Seminumerical Algorithms. Third Edition (Reading, Massachusetts: Addison-Wesley, 1997), xiv+762pp. . Errata:  (2011-01-08),  (2020-03-26, 26th printing). Addenda:  (2011).
 Volume 3: Sorting and Searching. Second Edition (Reading, Massachusetts: Addison-Wesley, 1998), xiv+780pp.+foldout. . Errata:  (2011-01-08),  (2020-03-26, 27th printing). Addenda:  (2011).
 Volume 4A: Combinatorial Algorithms, Part 1. First Edition (Upper Saddle River, New Jersey: Addison-Wesley, 2011), xv+883pp. . Errata:  (2020-03-26?, 22nd printing).
 Volume 4B: Combinatorial Algorithms, Part 2. First Edition (Upper Saddle River, New Jersey: Addison-Wesley, 2023), xviii+714pp. (2022-11-??, 2nd printing).
 Volume 1, Fascicle 1: MMIX – A RISC Computer for the New Millennium. (Addison-Wesley, 2005-02-14) . Errata:  (2020-03-16) (will be in the fourth edition of volume 1)

Previous editions

Complete volumes
These volumes were superseded by newer editions and are in order by date.
 Volume 1: Fundamental Algorithms. First edition, 1968, xxi+634pp, .
 Volume 2: Seminumerical Algorithms. First edition, 1969, xi+624pp, .
 Volume 3: Sorting and Searching. First edition, 1973, xi+723pp+foldout, . Errata: .
 Volume 1: Fundamental Algorithms. Second edition, 1973, xxi+634pp, . Errata: .
 Volume 2: Seminumerical Algorithms. Second edition, 1981, xiii+ 688pp, . Errata: .
 The Art of Computer Programming, Volumes 1-3 Boxed Set. Second Edition (Reading, Massachusetts: Addison-Wesley, 1998), pp. 
 The Art of Computer Programming, Volumes 1-4A Boxed Set. Third Edition (Reading, Massachusetts: Addison-Wesley, 2011), 3168pp.

Fascicles
Volume 4 fascicles 0–4 were revised and published as Volume 4A:
 Volume 4, Fascicle 0: Introduction to Combinatorial Algorithms and Boolean Functions. (Addison-Wesley Professional, 2008-04-28) vi+240pp, . Errata:  (2011-01-01).
 Volume 4, Fascicle 1: Bitwise Tricks & Techniques; Binary Decision Diagrams. (Addison-Wesley Professional, 2009-03-27) viii+260pp, . Errata:  (2011-01-01).
 Volume 4, Fascicle 2: Generating All Tuples and Permutations. (Addison-Wesley, 2005-02-14) v+127pp, . Errata:  (2011-01-01).
 Volume 4, Fascicle 3: Generating All Combinations and Partitions. (Addison-Wesley, 2005-07-26) vi+150pp, . Errata:  (2011-01-01).
 Volume 4, Fascicle 4: Generating All Trees; History of Combinatorial Generation. (Addison-Wesley, 2006-02-06) vi+120pp, . Errata:  (2011-01-01).
Volume 4 fascicles 5–6 were revised and partially published as Volume 4B:
 Volume 4, Fascicle 5: Mathematical Preliminaries Redux; Backtracking; Dancing Links. (Addison-Wesley, 2019-11-22) xiii+382pp, . Errata:  (2020-03-27)
 Volume 4, Fascicle 6: Satisfiability. (Addison-Wesley, 2015-12-08) xiii+310pp, . Errata:  (2020-03-26)

Pre-fascicles
Volume 4 pre-fascicles 5A, 5B, and 5C were revised and published as fascicle 5.

Volume 4 pre-fascicle 6A was revised and published as fascicle 6.

 Volume 4, Pre-fascicle 7A: Constraint Satisfaction
 Volume 4, Pre-fascicle 8A: Hamiltonian Paths and Cycles
 Volume 4, Pre-fascicle 9B: A Potpourri of Puzzles
 Volume 4, Pre-fascicle 12A: Components and Traversal (PDF Version) 
 Volume 4, Pre-fascicle 14A: Bipartite Matching

See also
 Introduction to Algorithms

References
Notes

Citations

Sources

External links
 Overview of topics (Knuth's personal homepage)
 Oral history interview with Donald E. Knuth at Charles Babbage Institute, University of Minnesota, Minneapolis. Knuth discusses software patenting, structured programming, collaboration and his development of TeX. The oral history discusses the writing of The Art of Computer Programming.
 "Robert W Floyd, In Memoriam", by Donald E. Knuth - (on the influence of Bob Floyd)
 TAoCP and its Influence of Computer Science (Softpanorama)

1968 non-fiction books
1969 non-fiction books
1973 non-fiction books
1981 non-fiction books
2011 non-fiction books
Addison-Wesley books
American non-fiction books
Analysis of algorithms
Books by Donald Knuth
Computer arithmetic algorithms
Computer programming books
Computer science books
English-language books
Monographs